Chips Ahoy! is an American chocolate chip cookie brand, baked and marketed by Nabisco, a subsidiary of Mondelez International, that debuted in 1963. Chips Ahoy! cookies are available in different variations such as, original, reduced-fat, chunky, chewy, and candy-blasts; each can be identified by variations in the color of the package. For example, Chips Ahoy! original has blue color packaging, while Chips Ahoy chewy has a  red packaging.

Etymology
Nabisco says the name is "a reference to the nautical term, Ships Ahoy!" The words "Chips Ahoy!" also feature prominently in a story appearing in Chapter 15 of The Uncommercial Traveller, by Charles Dickens. Dickens relays a childhood tale of a shipwright, named Chips, who is taunted by a diabolical talking rat who predicts the sinking of Chips's ship: "Chips ahoy! Old boy! We've pretty well eat them too, and we'll drown the crew, and will eat them too!" There is also a 1956 American animated theatrical short titled Chips Ahoy, with the same name.

History
Debuting in 1963, Chips Ahoy! is widely sold in the United States, Latin America (where its name in some countries is "Choco Chips", "Chips More!"), South Africa, Canada, India, Spain, Portugal, China, Indonesia, Taiwan, Mauritius, United Kingdom and many more regions. It is marketed in varieties of  mini-sized cookie packages to around  packages of standard-sized cookies. It is the third best-selling cookie in the United States after Oreo, also a Nabisco-branded cookie, with an average of  million in sales per year. By the 1980s, several different varieties of the cookie snack were being baked and shipped to grocery stores: chewy, sprinkled, and striped.

In Indonesia, Chips Ahoy! was initially available from 1995 until 2005 and relaunched in September 2015, and was later discontinued in that country in 2018.

Advertising campaigns
In the 1960s and early 1970s, Chips Ahoy bags featured comic strips of "Cookie Man", a superhero character who subdued various cookie-devouring creatures, such as Fruit Fly or Big Wig. His alter-ego was Mort Meek, who was always seen "counting the 16 chips" in his Chips Ahoy cookie when he was attacked by one of the creatures, at which point he slipped into a phone booth, locker room, restroom, etc., to become Cookie Man and finish off the villain in a Bruce Wayne/Batman vein. These characters were also the subject of Chips Ahoy's concurrent TV commercial campaign; and were both played by the same actor. In the early 1980s, children played 1940s-style newspaper reporters interested in "the 16 chips story" on the brand's commercials. For a time in the mid-1990s, advertising labeled Chips Ahoy as being, "1,000 chips delicious!", the acquired theme song for most of Chips Ahoy's commercials during its most popular time in the 1990s was a portion of the song "Sing, Sing, Sing" by Benny Goodman's jazz band in the 1930s. From 2001 to 2010, Chips Ahoy's mascots were the stop-motion animated "Cookie Guys" with one of their commercials having them drive a red convertible, singing the song "Don't You Want Me" by The Human League, driving past a Chips Ahoy sign. In 2010, the Cookie Guys were replaced by a live-action campaign on the theme of "joy" in which it is demonstrated that the simple act of opening a bag of Chips Ahoy brand cookies induces feelings of delight and exultation to the degree that one is affected with "happy feet," and begins dancing. In 2014, Chips Ahoy made its appearance to the UK and Ireland in two flavors, Popcorn Candy Chip and Crispy Choco Caramel. In Malaysia, Chips More advertisements were seen similar to Chips Ahoy's Cookie Man.

See also
 List of cookies

References

External links

 

Products introduced in 1963
Brand name cookies
Nabisco brands
Mondelez International brands